GSLP is the short form for Gender Self Learning Programme, under State Poverty Eradication Mission (otherwise known as Kudumbashree) of the Government of Keralam, a state in India.

References

Poverty in India
Government welfare schemes in Kerala